Lac de Chaumeçon is a lake in Nièvre, France. At an elevation of 400 m, its surface area is 1.35 km².

Chaumecon